The Hellenic Shooting Federation (HSF), Greek: Σκοπευτική Ομοσπονδία Ελλάδος, is an umbrella organization for sport shooting in Greece.

HSF is Greece's representative for the international shooting organizations International Shooting Sport Federation (ISSF), International Practical Shooting Confederation (IPSC), Fédération Internationale de Tir aux Armes Sportives de Chasse (FITASC), Muzzle Loaders Associations International Committee (MLAIC), International Metallic Silhouette Shooting Union (IMSSU), World Field Target Federation (WFTF) and the European Shooting Confederation (ESC).

See also 
 List of shooting sports organizations

Other umbrella organizations for shooting 
 Association of Maltese Arms Collectors and Shooters
 French Shooting Federation
 Finnish Shooting Sport Federation
 Monaco Shooting Federation
 Norwegian Shooting Association
 Royal Spanish Olympic Shooting Federation
 Swiss Shooting Sport Federation

References

External links
Official website

Regions of the International Practical Shooting Confederation
Shooting